Air Peace is a private Nigerian airline founded in 2013 with its head office in Ikeja, Lagos State, Nigeria, the flag carrier and the largest airline of Nigeria and West Africa. Air Peace, which provides passenger and charter services, serves the major cities of Nigeria and flies to several West African destinations and the Middle East. The airline also established a subsidiary, Air Peace Hopper, in 2018.

History

Founding
Air Peace was founded in 2013 by Nigerian lawyer and businessman Allen Onyema. Onyema claims that he started the airline with the intention of using it as an engine to provide economic opportunities to Nigerian youth. The airline began operations with Dornier 328s and Boeing 737s. In 2017, the first international route to Kotoka International Airport in Accra, Ghana was launched. By 2018, Air Peace had the largest market share in the domestic airline market in Nigeria. That same year, the airline took delivery of its first Boeing 777s, and it commenced flights to Sharjah in 2019. Flights to Johannesburg, South Africa commenced in 2020.

South Africa evacuation flights
Following an outbreak of xenophobic violence against foreign nationals in South Africa in September 2019, Air Peace offered to evacuate Nigerian citizens for free. Over 300 persons took advantage of this offer and traveled on board chartered Boeing 777 flights from Johannesburg to Lagos.

Money laundering allegations
In 2019, the US Department of Justice issued an indictment against Air Peace founder and CEO Allen Onyema on the grounds of money laundering and bank fraud. Onyema was accused of falsifying documents used for the purchase of aircraft for Air Peace and using those to fund purchases of luxury cars and high-end shopping. Onyema denies these allegations. As of May 2022, a trial is set to begin in August 2022.

Controversy with UAE
In December 2021, Air Peace indulged in a controversy with the General Civil Aviation Authority of the UAE. As per the reports, the Emirates turned down the airlines' request for three slots instead of one at the Sharjah International Airport in the UAE, calling it "unreasonable." The UAE authorities said that Air Peace should consider flying the other two flights to any of the other airports in the country. However, Air Peace condemned the Emirati claims, accusing its officials of falsehood. The airline also called for an apology from the UAE, along with a retraction. Prior to issue, the Nigerian government had reduced the slots of Dubai-based Emirates from 21 to one, following which Emirates Airline also suspended all its flights to Abuja and Lagos. The matter came as a threat to the diplomatic relations between the two countries. A diplomatic crisis was averted after Dubai Airports allocated slots at Dubai for Air Peace.

Operations Halt
In May 2022, Air Peace announced a plan to halt all domestic and regional flights, along with other airlines such as Max Air, Arik Air, Ibom Air, United Nigeria Airlines, and others, citing staffing and the rising costs of jet fuel. However, that plan was abandoned after government officials stepped in to aid the airlines affected.

Destinations
As of February 2023, Air Peace flies to the following destinations in Nigeria, west Africa, South Africa and United Arab Emirates.

On January 31, 2020, Air Peace announced two new destinations in India and Israel would be activated before the end of the year. Air Peace also operated ad hoc charter flights from Lagos to Montego Bay in Jamaica during the Christmas 2020 season.

Fleet

As of January 2022, Air Peace's fleet consists of the following aircraft:

In April 2021, the Chief Operations Officer of Air Peace stated that 17 of their aircraft were grounded for maintenance reasons, thus reducing the carrier's operational fleet to just 8 aircraft.

Accidents and incidents

Safety concerns and cover-ups
In 2019, the Accident Investigation Bureau (Nigeria) accused Air Peace of persistent failure to report serious incidents and accidents involving its aircraft. Some issues cited by the AIB included failure to report incidents that resulted in structural damage and erasure of Cockpit Voice Recorders prior to reporting incidents. The airline's management was cited for "willfully [failing] to comply" with the Bureau's regulations, and it was further stated that the management "lacks the full understanding of the statutory mandates".

List of accidents and serious incidents
 On 12 March 2016, an Air Peace Boeing 737 from Port Harcourt to Lagos made an emergency landing in Port Harcourt following a smoke detector indication. The aircraft was evacuated via slides and there were no serious injuries.
 On 14 December 2018, an Air Peace Boeing 737 from Lagos to Enugu with 130 passengers and 6 crew suffered a loss of cabin pressure at 31000 feet. Although the oxygen masks deployed, the crew elected to continue the flight after an emergency descent. Two passengers were subsequently treated for complications related to the decompression.
 On 15 May 2019, an Air Peace Boeing 737 from Port Harcourt to Lagos suffered a hard landing that resulted in damage to the engine pod and the landing gear. The aircraft was grounded, although no injuries were reported.
 On 22 June 2019, an Air Peace Boeing 737 with 87 passengers and 6 crew from Abuja to Port Harcourt exited the runway while landing in heavy rain and came to rest in soft mud.
 On 23 July 2019, an Air Peace Boeing 737 with 133 passengers and 6 crew landed on Lagos' runway 18R but suffered a hard touch down causing both nose wheels to separate from the nose gear strut. The aircraft skidded to a halt on the runway on main wheels and the rest of the nose gear strut. There was one minor injury. The aircraft sustained substantial damage as did the runway.
 On 5 November 2019, an Air Peace Boeing 737 with 90 passengers and 6 crew suffered an engine failure en route from Lagos to Owerri. The aircraft returned to Lagos where it landed safely without further incident.
 On 24 July 2021, an Air Peace Boeing 737 from Abuja to Ilorin suffered burst nose gear tires and became disabled on the runway upon landing. The airport was closed until the damaged aircraft could be safely removed from the runway.
 On 22 November 2021, an Air Peace Boeing 737 with 95 passengers and 6 crew flying from Owerri to Lagos reported an engine failure and suspected fire immediately following departure. The crew returned safely to land in Owerri on a single engine.

References

External links
 
 Official website

Airlines of Nigeria
Charter airlines
Airlines established in 2013
Companies based in Lagos
Nigerian companies established in 2013